The 1971–72 season is Real Madrid Club de Fútbol's 69th season in existence and the club's 40th consecutive season in the top flight of Spanish football.

Summary 
During summer President Santiago Bernabéu transferred out several players such as Sanchis, Bueno, Planelles, Gento (retired), Betancort, Calpe, De La Fuente, Jimenez, Espíldora and Fermín. The club new arrivals were goalkeeper García Remón and a teenage 19-yrs-old forward Santillana in a sign of rejuvenate the squad and a reduced transfers budget for the upcoming years.

The club won its 15th League title two points above Defending Champions Valencia CF after a 0–0 draw of CF Barcelona against Córdoba CF at Los Carmenes one round before season finale. The team played the UEFA Cup for the first time and was early eliminated in Eightfinals by Dutch side PSV Eindhoven due to away goals. During June, the squad reached the 1971–72 Copa del Generalísimo semi-finals being defeated by Valencia CF lost 1–0 at Mestalla and a draw 0–0 in Madrid.

Squad

Transfers

Competitions

La Liga

Position by round

League table

Matches

Copa del Generalísimo

Eightfinals

Quarter-finals

Semi-finals

UEFA Cup

Eightfinals

Statistics

Players statistics

References

External links 
 BDFútbol

Real Madrid CF seasons
Spanish football championship-winning seasons
Real Madrid